The zebu (Bos indicus or Bos taurus indicus), sometimes known in the plural as indicine cattle or humped cattle, is a species or subspecies of domestic cattle originating in the Indian sub-continent. Zebu are characterised by a fatty hump on their shoulders, a large dewlap, and sometimes drooping ears. They are well adapted to withstanding high temperatures, and are farmed throughout the tropical countries, both as pure zebu and as hybrids with taurine cattle, the other main type of domestic cattle. Zebu are used as draught and riding animals, dairy cattle, and beef cattle, as well as for byproducts such as hides and dung for fuel and manure. Some small breeds such as the miniature zebu are also kept as pets. In 1999, researchers at Texas A&M University successfully cloned a zebu.

In some regions, such as parts of India, zebu are among the cattle that have significant religious meaning.

Taxonomy and name
The scientific name Bos indicus was introduced by Carl Linnaeus in 1758 for humped cattle in China. The zebu was classified as a distinct species by Juliet Clutton-Brock in 1999, but as a subspecies of the domestic cattle, Bos taurus indicus, by Peter Grubb in 2005.
In 2011, Colin Groves and Peter Grubb classified it as a distinct species again. The American Society of Mammalogists also considers it to be a species.

Origin

Zebu cattle are thought to be derived from the Indian aurochs Bos primigenius namadicus, a subspecies of the aurochs. Wild Asian aurochs disappeared during the time of the Indus Valley civilisation from its range in the Indus River basin and other parts of the South Asian region possibly due to interbreeding with domestic zebu and resultant fragmentation of wild populations due to loss of habitat. Bos primigenius namadicus was likely extinct long before 1300 AD and no remains younger than 1800 BC were ever found.

Believed to be first bred in northwestern South Asia, between 7000 and 6000 BCE, indicine cattle is understood to have been dispersed throughout northwestern South Asia by 4000 BCE, and spread across much of South Asia by 2000 BCE.

Archaeological evidence including depictions on pottery and rocks suggests that it was present in Egypt around 2000 BC and thought to be imported from the Near East or south. It is thought to have first appeared in sub-Saharan Africa after 700 AD and was introduced to the Horn of Africa around 1000.

Phylogenetic analysis revealed that all the zebu Y chromosome haplotype groups are found in three different lineages: Y3A, the most predominant and cosmopolitan lineage; Y3B, only observed in West Africa; and Y3C, predominant in south and northeast India.

Breeds and hybrids

Some 75 breeds of zebu are known, split about evenly between African breeds and Indian ones. The major zebu cattle breeds of the world include Gyr, Kankrej and Guzerat, Indo-Brazilian, Brahman, Sibi Bhagnari, White Nukra, Acchai, Cholistani,
Dhanni, Lohani, Nelore, Ongole, Sahiwal, Red Sindhi, Butana and Kenana, Baggara, Tharparkar, Kangayam, Southern Yellow, Kedah-Kelantan and Local Indian Dairy (LID). Kedah-Kelantan and LID originated from Malaysia. Other breeds of zebu are quite local, like the Hariana of Haryana and eastern Punjab or the Rath of Alwar district in eastern Rajasthan.

Zebu, which can tolerate extreme heat, were imported into Brazil in the early 20th century. Their importation marked a change in cattle ranching in Brazil, where feral cattle had grazed freely on extensive pasturage, and bred without animal husbandry. Zebu were considered "ecological" since they could graze on natural grasses and their meat was lean and without chemical residues.

From the 1960s onwards, Nelore which is an off breed of Ongole Cattle became the primary breed of cattle in Brazil because of its hardiness, heat-resistance, and because it thrives on poor-quality forage and breeds easily, with the calves rarely requiring human intervention to survive. Currently more than 80% of beef cattle in Brazil (approximately 167,000,000 animals) are either purebred or hybrid Ongole Cattle which is originated from Ongle region of Andhra Pradesh.

The African sanga cattle breeds originated from hybridization of zebu with indigenous African humpless cattle; they include the Afrikaner, Red Fulani cattle, Ankole-Watusi, Boran cattle and many other breeds of central and southern Africa.  Sanga cattle can be distinguished from pure zebu by their having smaller humps located farther forward on the animals.

Zebu were imported to Africa over many hundreds of years, and interbred with taurine cattle there. Genetic analysis of African cattle has found higher concentrations of zebu genes all along the east coast of Africa, with especially pure cattle on the island of Madagascar, either implying that the method of dispersal was cattle transported by ship or alternatively, the zebu may have reached East Africa via the coastal route (Pakistan, Iran, Southern Arabian coast) much earlier and crossed over to Madagascar. Partial resistance to rinderpest led to another increase in the frequency of zebu in Africa.

In the early 20th century in Brazil, Zebu were crossbred with Charolais cattle, a European taurine breed. The resulting breed, 63% Charolais and 37% zebu, is called the Canchim. It has a better meat quality than the zebu and better heat resistance than European cattle. The zebu breeds used were primarily Indo-Brazilian with some Nelore and Guzerat. Another Charolais cross-breed with Brahmans is called Australian Charbray and is recognised as a breed in some countries. Zebu are very common in much of Asia, including China, Pakistan, India, Nepal, Bangladesh and almost all countries in Southeast Asia. In Asia, taurine cattle are only found in the northern regions such as Japan, Korea, and Mongolia, possibly domesticated separately from the other taurine cattle originating from Europe and Africa).

Characteristics

Zebu have humps on the shoulders, large dewlaps, and droopy ears. Compared to taurine cattle, zebus are well adapted to the hot, dry environment of the tropics. Adaptations include resistance to drought and tolerance of intense heat and sunlight.

As expected for a non-African breed, the zebu does not appear to have any trypanotolerance, as evidenced by the pattern of zebu introgression into African cattle. There is a decrease up to - and rapid end at - tsetse-infested areas.

Zebu is phenotypically recognized by their hump on the backside of their body, their excess skin, and their large ears. Furthermore, another important characteristic of the Zebu is that they are able to defend against parasites and diseases quite well considering the harsh environment they reside in.

Reproduction
Zebu are generally mature enough to give birth when they are 29 months old. This is based on the development of their bodies to withstand the strain of carrying and lactation. Early reproduction can place too much stress on the body and possibly shorten lifespans. Carrying time of the calf averages at 285 days, but varies depending on the age and nutrition of the mother. The sex of the calf may also affect the carrying time, as male calves are carried for a longer period than females. Location, breed, body weight, and season affect the overall health of the animal and in return may also affect the carrying period.

Behavior 
Studies on the natural weaning of zebu cattle have shown that the cow weans her calves over a 2-week period, but after that, she continues to show strong affiliatory behavior with her offspring and preferentially chooses them for grooming and as grazing partners for at least 4–5 years.

Uses

Zebu are used as draught and riding animals, dairy cattle, as well as for byproducts such as hides, dung for fuel and manure, and horn for knife handles and the like. Zebu, mostly miniature zebu, are kept as pets. In India, the number of draft cattle in 1998 was estimated at 65.7 million head.
Zebu cows commonly have low production of milk. They do not produce milk until maturation later in their lives and do not produce much. When zebus are crossed with taurine cattle, milk production generally increases.

Jallikattu in India is a bull taming sport radically different from European bullfighting, humans are unarmed and bulls are not killed.

Hindu tradition 
Zebu are venerated within the Hindu religion of India. In the Vedic period they were a symbol of plenty. In later times they gradually acquired their present status. According to the Mahabharata, they are to be treated with the same respect 'as one's mother'. In the middle of the first millennium, the consumption of beef began to be disfavoured by lawgivers. Cows appear in numerous stories from the Vedas and Puranas. The deity Krishna was brought up in a family of cowherders, and given the name Govinda (protector of the cows). Also, Shiva is traditionally said to ride on the back of a bull named Nandi.

Milk and milk products were used in Vedic rituals. In the postvedic period products of the cow—milk, curd, ghee, but also cow dung and urine (gomutra), or the combination of these five (panchagavya)—began to assume an increasingly important role in ritual purification and expiation.

See also
 List of Indian cattle breeds
List of animals with humps
List of cattle breeds

References

External links 

Bovines
Mammals described in 1758
Domesticated animals
Taxa named by Carl Linnaeus